Katharina Caroline "Caro" Daur (born 12 March 1995) is a German fashion blogger and model.

Biography 
Daur was born on 12 March 1995 in Hamburg, Germany and grew up in Seevetal. She began fashion blogging in 2014, launching CaroDaur.com. Since the start of her blog, she has become a notable international fashion influencer. Through her blog, she has partnered with companies like Adidas, Dolce & Gabbana, Fendi or Valentino. She also worked on global campaigns for MAC Cosmetics, APM, and Dolce & Gabbana.

In 2015 she was a recipient of the New Faces Award by Bunte in the fashion digital category. In May 2017 she was honored as an Idol of the Year at the About You Awards.

References 

1995 births
Living people
21st-century German women writers
Fashion influencers
German bloggers
German TikTokers
German female models
German women bloggers
People from Harburg (district)